Bertholdia is a genus of moths in the family Erebidae.

Species

 Bertholdia albipuncta Schaus, 1896
 Bertholdia almeidai Travassos, 1950
 Bertholdia aroana Strand, 1919
 Bertholdia crocea Schaus, 1910
 Bertholdia detracta Seitz, 1921
 Bertholdia flavidorsata Hampson, 1901
 Bertholdia flavilucens Schaus, 1920
 Bertholdia fumida Schaus, 1910
 Bertholdia grisescens Rothschild, 1909
 Bertholdia livida Seitz, 1921
 Bertholdia myosticta Druce, 1897
 Bertholdia ockendeni Rothschild, 1909
 Bertholdia philotera Druce, 1897
 Bertholdia pseudofumida Travassos, 1950
 Bertholdia rubromaculata Rothschild, 1909
 Bertholdia schausiana Dyar, 1898
 Bertholdia semiumbrata Seitz, 1921
 Bertholdia soror Dyar, 1901
 Bertholdia specularis (Herrich-Schäffer, [1853])
 Bertholdia steinbachi Rothschild, 1909
 Bertholdia trigona (Grote, 1879) – Grote's bertholdia moth

References

External links
 Natural History Museum Lepidoptera generic names catalog

Phaegopterina
Moth genera